Katharina Tschupp (born 21 May 2006) is a Liechtensteiner footballer who plays as a midfielder in the youth team of Luzern and for the Liechtenstein national football team.

Tschupp made her senior debut for Liechtenstein in a friendly against Gibraltar on 24 June 2021 coming on as a substitute in the 60th minute, and scored her first goal with a header from a corner kick six minutes later.

Career statistics

International

International goals

References

2006 births
Living people
Women's association football midfielders
Liechtenstein women's international footballers
Liechtenstein women's footballers